P Namgyal (17 December 1937 - 1 June 2020) was an Indian politician, agriculturist, social worker and three-time Congress MP from Ladakh serving from 1980 till 1989 and 1996 to 1998. He also served the Pradesh Congress Committee in the erstwhile Jammu and Kashmir (state) as secretary-general and vice president.

He died on 1 June 2020 from COVID-19 during the COVID-19 pandemic in India. While returning from Delhi he was under home quarantine. After feeling not well on the same morning, he was rushed in a hospital where he died.

References

1937 births
2020 deaths
Indian politicians
Deaths from the COVID-19 pandemic in India
Indian National Congress politicians
India MPs 1980–1984
India MPs 1984–1989